Leah Bergstein (October 23, 1902 - 1989) of Galician Jews origin was among the first choreographers in Mandatory Palestine who created festival dances at kibbutzim. Bergstein is considered one of the "mothers" of early Israeli folk dance, inventing a new style of movement and laying the foundation of folk dance emerging as an Israeli cultural tradition. She was the only professional dancer to work in the original folk dance movement at the time.

Early life

Family 

Bergstein was born in Bilshivtsi in Galicia (now in Ukraine). She was the daughter of Moshe Bergstein and Liba (née Shor). Bergstein's grandfather, Ya’akov Bergstein, was the Nagid of the Jewish community in his town. She had six siblings: David, Isaac, Effie, Haya Dirnal, Hannah Broner, and Rivka.

At the start of World War I in 1914, the Bergstein family fled to Vienna, Austria. Bergstein's parents emigrated to Mandatory Palestine in 1938.

Training 

In Vienna, Bergstein studied modern dance with a colleague of Isadora Duncan. Bergstein studied the foundations of movement derived from Greek culture and dance, choreographing short dances inspired by ancient Greek vase paintings. Bergstein said of this training, "We learned Greek dances and I saw from this the road of re-creation for the dances of Israel. I learned how to return."

Bergstein also encountered Anthroposophy, a movement founded by Rudolf Steiner centering a mystical belief in life after death and reincarnation. Building upon her foundation in Anthroposophy, Bergstein explored connections between word and movement in choreographing her first two dances, based on poems by Goethe. Through Steiner's Theosophy, Bergstein encountered Indian dance, discovering her natural affinity for Indian classical movement.

After taking courses in pedagogy and gymnastics and studying to become a kindergarten teacher, Bergstein studied dance at the school of Margaret Schmidt, a student of Rudolf von Laban. In the practices of Laban, Bergstein expanded her vocabulary of modern dance movement. She was also impressed by Laban's efforts to reimagine folk festivals, in reaction to its seeming decline, to enable people without prior technical knowledge to perform dances as a way of celebrating and expressing joy.

Bergstein continued her dancing career in the company of Vera Skoronel, a student of Mary Wigman, who had also studied with Laban. With the rise of anti-Semitism, however, Bergstein heard people comment on her Jewish surname and decided to give up her career as a professional dancer to emigrate to Palestine. She began to feel more strongly that the Jewish people's return to its land must be accompanied by the building of its own culture.

Life and work in Palestine

Kibbutz Beit Alfa 

Bergstein arrived in Mandatory Palestine in 1925 and joined Kibbutz Beit Alfa in the Jezreel Valley. In the gendered hierarchy of the kibbutz, she started working in the laundry, which posed difficulties for Bergstein as a dancer and a woman. Dancing was perceived as a secondary task to the "real" work: farming and construction for men, cooking and cleaning for women. Bergstein initially tried to rehearse after working hours but soon found that she did not have sufficient time to choreograph or rehearse. Despite the demanding and constricting responsibilities for their gender, women dance leaders' artistic contributions, including those of Bergstein, were seen as secondary in the Zionist movement.

The members of Kibbutz Beit Alfa began to learn about sheepherding and shearing from the surrounding Bedouin encampments and extended mutual invitations to festivals and other celebrations. When attending the Arab village festivity, Bergstein noted the ways in which women participated in the dabke, a traditionally male-dominant dance, from the Sheikh's wife's Laban-like sword dance and a girl's delicate walk through a circle of men dancing. She cited her observation of the Arab dances as an influence in creating folk dances in kibbutzim and moshavim. She was inspired by the nomadic culture's rich traditions of ceremonies, songs, and dances that were deeply connected to the earth and nature.

In 1929, the kibbutz shepherds requested that Bergstein create a festive event to celebrate the end of sheep shearing. Bergstein planned the festive event to accompany the shearing process, including songs and stories composed by the shepherds and performed for the kibbutz audience. The festival initiated Bergstein's collaboration with Polish-born poet-composer Mattityahu Shelem and marked the first nature celebration of the labor settlement movement containing a choreographic element. This celebration served as a landmark in the development of the kibbutz festival and Israeli folk-cultural life.

In 1933, the kibbutz pediatrician sent Bergstein to Vienna to study early childhood care through gymnastics. During her trip, she was reunited with Gertrud Kraus and joined Kraus's dance company for performances in Vienna, including "The Town is Waiting". Bergstein accompanied Kraus when the dancer emigrated to Palestine in 1936, staying with her to help her open a dance studio in Tel Aviv. In the 1940s, Bergstein returned to Kibbutz Beit Alfa. After a split within the kibbutz, she and a group of friends, including Shelem, moved to Kibbutz Ramat Yohanan.

Kibbutz Ramat Yohanan 

Continuing her collaboration with Shelem, Bergstein developed original festivals for holidays at Ramat Yohanan. Since no ancient dances had survived among the Jewish people, Bergstein and Shelem were committed to cultural creation as a means of building the national and societal identity of the country of Israel. They created festival ceremonies around events such as the grape harvest, shepherds, and weddings.

Bergstein choreographed 51 festival dances, including "Rov Berakhot" (Many Blessings), "Hen Yeronan" (Thus shall we rejoice), "Shibbolet ba-Sadeh" (A Sheaf in the Field) and "Shiru ha-Shir" (Sing the Song). Forty of Bergstein's dances were choreographed to music composed by Shelem. Bergstein created dances that arose from her feelings when listening to the music and believed that the subject of the dance should relate to the words of the song. Bergstein said that she choreographed folk dances "to enhance the spirit of our holidays, to be merry with my group in the evenings, to give a kind of coherence to the kibbutz despite the range in ages from children to grandparents," and to tell a story.

She taught these dances to one of her pupils, who would then pass it on to her friends. Following this transmission, Bergstein would ask the amateur kibbutz members whether they found the dance comfortable and enjoyable so that she could ensure a clear connection between form and content. Audience participation was an essential component of Bergstein's ceremonies and dances.

Festivals

The Sheep-Shearing Festival (Chag HaGez) 
Inspired by Bedouin traditions, Bergstein created a festival to accompany the end of sheep shearing. Bergstein choreographed to songs composed by Shelem, including "Se ugedi" (A Lamb and a Kid), "Sisu ve simchu na" (Be Joyful and Celebrate), "Ro’e ve ro’a" (A Shepherd and a Shepherdess),. Bergstein's choreography to Shelem's song "Sheep and Goat, Goat and Sheep Went Out Together to the Field" served as the basis for the shearing festival. Bergstein and Shelem aimed to recreate the holidays as described in the Torah, the first such revival since Biblical times. Bergstein created dances for the multigenerational community at Beit Alfa. She aimed for the celebration to be "like a prayer for the whole nation that everyone could dance." These dances were performed alongside the sheep pen. Beginning in 1929, the shearing festivity was only held for two consecutive years, but it is nonetheless seen as a turning point for creating kibbutz festivities.

The Omer Festival 

Celebrated on Passover eve, the Omer harvest festival, revived by Bergstein and Shelem at Ramat Yohanan, commemorated the ancient ritual cutting of the wheat. Bergstein built a stage in the field and covered the planks with wheat to create the illusion of dancing on the tops of wheat. This festival marked an important moment in the connection between the people and the land. Building upon the traditions of ancient ceremonies, Bergstein and Shelem added dances and songs to the old material, expanding the festivities to reflect contemporary values. Gurit Kadman, a festival folk dance organizer, once said Bergstein's Omer Festival was "the creation of the most original holiday in Israel, and the holiday dances are perhaps the most Israeli ones ever created." When Israel became independent, Bergstein added the dance "Hen Yerunan" (Also It Will Be Sung) to the festivities. Bergstein's choreography to "Masekhet ha-Omer" (Omer Pageant) has been performed outside of the context of the rural festival, including at the national dance festival at Kibbutz Dalia.

The Harvest Festival/The Water Festival 
Bergstein created the Harvest Festival at the beginning of the 1940s to celebrate Sukkot. The festival opened with the song "Pit’hu She’arim" (Open the Gates) and a dance to the song "Rov Berakhot." The songs and dances in this festival expressed the joy of the harvest and Simchat Beit HaShoeivah. Bergstein's choreography included a dance with pitchers, and rousing wine-dance, and the heroic debka to Shelem's song "Livshu-na Oz" (Put On Strength). The text and blessings used for the Harvest Festival were written by the kindergarten teachers of the kibbutz. In later years, the festival was renamed the Water Festival and celebrated around the swimming pool at Ramat Yohanan.

The Festival of First Fruits (Shavuot) 
In the 1940s, Bergstein and Shelem created a ceremony to celebrate Shavuot. The festival began with Bergstein's dance "Kumu v’Na’ale" (Let Us Arise and Ascend), which depicted the pilgrimage of the Jews who brought the Bikkurim to the steps of the Temple.

Tu BiShvat 
Bergstein choreographed dances for Tu BiShvat to celebrate the arrival of spring. Bergstein used various popular songs of the time for this festival.

The Wedding Ceremony 
Bergstein created a ceremony and dances for kibbutz weddings. These celebrations, involving the entire kibbutz, incorporated word, sound, and movement, combining Jewish practices from various ethnic communities, including the traditional Eastern European Jewish wedding dance sherele, with traditions from classical Jewish sources.

Dissemination of Bergstein's dances 
At the end of the 1940s and throughout the 1950s, Bergstein taught at the Folk Dance Department of the Histadrut, directed by Tirza Hodes. Working in Tel Aviv, however, solidified her belief in imbuing her work with a holiness of place, rather than creating for the stage.

Bergstein founded the Ramat Yohanan Dance Troupe for a group of young girls, who performed for soldiers during the War of Independence, at the folk-dance festivals on Kibbutz Dalia, and for the State of Israel's tenth anniversary. After the group dissolved and was replaced by the Beni ha-Ilhud Troupe, Bergstein continued to impart her ideas to the next generation through the second troupe at Ramat Yohanan.

Bergstein's dances have inspired subsequent Israeli folk-dance choreographers. She is part of a lineage of dancers and choreographers, including Gurit Kadman, Rivka Sturman, Sara Levi-Tanai, Yardena Cohen, Tirza Hodes, Shalom Hermon, Yoav Ashriel, Yonatan Karmon, and Moshiko (Moshe Itzhak-Halevy). Although Bergstein considered her dances to be inseparable parts of her pageants, they have become lasting features of Israeli folk dance and are still taught and performed around the world today.

Personal life 
Bergstein's first husband was a kibbutz member. Her second partner was a veterinarian for the Jezreel Valley, whose wife refused to divorce him. She became pregnant with her daughter, Rahel, with her third partner, but she broke off her relationship with him while pregnant. Rahel was born in 1940, and Bergstein remained a single mother.

See also 
 Jewish dance
 Folk dance
 Dance in Israel
 Culture in Israel

References

Further reading 
 Eshel, Ruth. To Dance with the Dream: The Beginning of Artistic Dance in Eretz Israel 1920–1964 (with English summary). Tel Aviv: 1991.
 Goren, Yoram (ed.), Fields Adorned in Dance, On Leah Bergstein and Her Contribution to Israeli Festivals and Dance (שדות לבשו מחול : על לאה ברגשטיין מרמת-יוחנן ותרומתה לעיצוב המחול והחג הישראלי), Kibbutz Ramat Yohanan, 1983.

External links 

 http://israelidances.com/search.asp?S=A&PageNo=1&ChoreographerName=Leah%20Bergstein 
על פועלה של הכוריאוגרפית ורועת הצאן לאה ברגשטיין (On the work of choreographer and shepherd Leah Bergstein),  National Library of Israel 
Leah Bergstein archive, National Library of Israel

Other notable Israeli folk dance choreographers 
 Gurit Kadman: https://jwa.org/encyclopedia/article/kadman-gurit 
 Rivka Sturman: https://jwa.org/encyclopedia/article/sturman-rivka 
 Sara Levi-Tanai: https://jwa.org/encyclopedia/article/levi-tanai-sara 
 Yardena Cohen: https://jwa.org/encyclopedia/article/cohen-yardena 
 Shalom Hermon: http://www.socalfolkdance.org/master_teachers/hermon_s.htm 
 Yoav Ashriel: http://israelidances.com/choreographer.asp?name=yoavashriel 
 Yonatan Karmon: http://www.socalfolkdance.org/master_teachers/karmon_j.htm 
 Moshiko (Moshe Itzhak-Halevy): http://www.socalfolkdance.org/master_teachers/halevy_m.htm

Israeli female dancers
Israeli choreographers
Jewish dancers
Jewish women
1902 births
1989 deaths
Austrian emigrants to Mandatory Palestine
People from Ivano-Frankivsk Oblast
Jews from Galicia (Eastern Europe)